The 1996 Stanford Cardinal football team represented Stanford University in the 1996 NCAA Division I-A football season. The team was led by head coach Tyrone Willingham.

Schedule

Roster

References

Stanford
Stanford Cardinal football seasons
Sun Bowl champion seasons
Stanford Cardinal football